Copenhagen shootings may refer to any of these shooting incidents that have occurred in Copenhagen:

 1996 Copenhagen Airport shooting
 2015 Copenhagen shootings
 2016 Copenhagen shooting
 2022 Copenhagen mall shooting

See also 
 Lars Vilks Muhammad drawings controversy
 Royal Copenhagen Shooting Society